Marco Ladner (born 22 April 1998 in Zams) is an Austrian freestyle skier, specializing in halfpipe.

Ladner competed at the 2014 Winter Olympics for Austria. He placed 19th in the qualifying round in the halfpipe, failing to advance.

Ladner made his World Cup debut in August 2012. As of April 2014, his best World Cup finish is 9th, at Calgary in 2013–14. His best World Cup overall finish in halfpipe is 24th, in 2013–14.

References

1998 births
Living people
Olympic freestyle skiers of Austria
Freestyle skiers at the 2014 Winter Olympics
Freestyle skiers at the 2018 Winter Olympics
Freestyle skiers at the 2022 Winter Olympics
People from Landeck District
Austrian male freestyle skiers
Freestyle skiers at the 2016 Winter Youth Olympics
Sportspeople from Tyrol (state)